3-Chloro-PCP (3'-Cl-PCP) is a recreational designer drug from the arylcyclohexylamine family, with dissociative effects. It has comparable potency to phencyclidine but with a slightly different effects profile, being somewhat more potent as an NMDA antagonist but around the same potency as a dopamine reuptake inhibitor. It was first identified in Slovenia in December 2020, and was made illegal in Hungary in April 2021.

See also 
 3-F-PCP
 3-Me-PCP
 3-MeO-PCP
 4-Keto-PCP

References 

Arylcyclohexylamines
Designer drugs
Dissociative drugs
Chloroarenes
1-Piperidinyl compounds